The 1895–96 season was Newcastle United's third season in the Football League Second Division.

Appearances and goals

Competitions

League

FA Cup

Friendlies

Matches

League

FA Cup

Friendlies

External links
Newcastle United – Historical Football Kits
Season Details – 1895–96 – toon1892
NUFC.com Archives – Match Stats – 1895–96
Newcastle United 1895–1896 Home – statto.com

Newcastle United F.C. seasons
Newcastle United